Abū Manṣūr Mauhūb al-Jawālīqī (April 1074–17 July 1144), Arab grammarian, was born in Baghdād, where he studied philology under Khātib al-Tibrizī (1030 - 1109) and became famous for his handwriting. In his later years he acted as Imam to the Abbāsid caliph Al-Muqtafi.

Works
Kitāb al-Mu'arrab, (tr. 'Explanation of Foreign Words used in Arabic'). His chief work; published as edited text from an incomplete manuscript by Eduard Sachau (Leipzig, 1867). Many of the lacunae in this have been supplied from another manuscript by W. Spitta in the Journal of the German Oriental Society, xxxiii. 208 sqq.
Al-Jawālīqī's Supplement to the Durrat ul-Ghawwas of Al-Hariri of Basra; published as Le Livre des locutions vicieuses, Arabic text with French introduction and notes by Hartwig Derenbourg, Morgenländische Forschungen (Leipzig, 1875), pp. 107–166.

See also
 Abd al-Latif al-Baghdadi a physician, philosopher, historian, Arabic grammarian.

Notes

References
 

11th-century Arabs
Arab grammarians
Medieval grammarians of Arabic
Scholars from the Abbasid Caliphate
People from Baghdad
1074 births
1144 deaths
Hadith scholars
12th-century Arabs